Info-gap decision theory seeks to optimize robustness to failure under severe uncertainty, in particular applying sensitivity analysis of the stability radius type to perturbations in the value of a given estimate of the parameter of interest. It has some connections with Wald's maximin model; some authors distinguish them, others consider them instances of the same principle.

It has been developed by Yakov Ben-Haim, and has found many applications and described as a theory for decision-making under "severe uncertainty".  It has been criticized as unsuited for this purpose, and alternatives proposed, including such classical approaches as robust optimization.

Summary 
Info-gap is a theory: it assists in decisions under uncertainty. It does this by using models, each built on the last. One begins with a model for the situation, where some parameter or parameters are unknown.
Then takes an estimate for the parameter, and one analyzes how sensitive the outcomes under the model are to the error in this estimate.
Uncertainty model Starting from the estimate, an uncertainty model measures how far away other values of the parameter are: as uncertainty increases, the set of values increase.
Robustness/opportuneness model Given an uncertainty model, then for each decision, how uncertain can you be and be confident succeeding? (robustness) Also, given a windfall, how uncertain must you be for this result to be plausible? (opportuneness)
Decision-making model One optimizes the robustness on the basis of the model. Given an outcome, which decision can stand the most uncertainty and give the outcome? Also, given a windfall, which decision requires the least uncertainty for the outcome?

Models 
Info-gap theory models uncertainty as subsets  around a point estimate : the estimate is accurate, and uncertainty increases, in general without bound. The uncertainty measures the "distance" between an estimate and a plausibility – providing an intermediate measure between a point (the point estimate) and all plausibilities, and giving a sensitivity measure: what is the margin of error?

Info-gap analysis gives answers to such questions as:
 under what level of uncertainty can specific requirements be reliably assured (robustness), and
 what level of uncertainty is necessary to achieve certain windfalls (opportuneness).
It can be used for satisficing, as an alternative to optimizing in the presence of uncertainty or bounded rationality; see robust optimization for an alternative approach.

Comparison with classical decision theory 

In contrast to probabilistic decision theory, info-gap analysis does not use probability distributions: it measures the deviation of errors (differences between the parameter and the estimate), but not the probability of outcomes – in particular, the estimate  is in no sense more or less likely than other points, as info-gap does not use probability. Info-gap, by not using probability distributions, is robust in that it is not sensitive to assumptions on probabilities of outcomes. However, the model of uncertainty does include a notion of "closer" and "more distant" outcomes, and thus includes some assumptions, and is not as robust as simply considering all possible outcomes, as in minimax. Further, it considers a fixed universe  so it is not robust to unexpected (not modeled) events.

The connection to minimax analysis has occasioned some controversy: (Ben-Haim 1999, pp. 271–2) argues that info-gap's robustness analysis, while similar in some ways, is not minimax worst-case analysis, as it does not evaluate decisions over all possible outcomes, while (Sniedovich, 2007) argues that the robustness analysis can be seen as an example of maximin (not minimax). This is discussed in criticism, below, and elaborated in the classical decision theory perspective.

Basic example: budget 
As a simple example, consider a worker. They expect to make $20 per week, while if they make under $15 they will be unable to work and will sleep in the street, otherwise they can afford a night's entertainment.

Using absolute error model:

where  one can say the robustness is $15, and opportuneness is $20: if they make $20, they will not sleep rough nor feast, and if they make within $20 of $200. But, if they erred by $20, they may sleep rough, while for more than $30, they may find themselves dining in opulence.

As stated, this example is only descriptive, and does not enable any decision making – in applications, one considers alternative decision rules, and often situations with more complex uncertainty.

The worker is thinking of moving elsewhere, where accommodation is cheaper. They will earn $26 per week, but hostels costs $20, while entertainment still costs $170. In that case the robustness will be $24, and the opportuneness will be $43. The second case has less robustness and less opportuneness.

But, measuring uncertainty by relative error,

robustness is 20% and opportuneness is 23%, while in the other robustness is 38% and opportuneness is 60%, so moving is less opportune.

Info-gap models 
Info-gap can be applied to spaces of functions; in that case the uncertain parameter is a function  with estimate  and the nested subsets are sets of functions.

For example, the above fraction error model for values becomes the fractional error model for functions by adding a parameter x to the definition:

More generally, if  is a family of info-gap models of values, then one obtains an info-gap model of functions in the same way:

Motivation 

It is common to make decisions under uncertainty. What can be done to make good (or at least the best possible) decisions under conditions of uncertainty? Info-gap robustness analysis evaluates each feasible decision by asking: how much deviation from an estimate of a parameter value, function, or set, is permitted and yet "guarantee" acceptable performance? In everyday terms, the "robustness" of a decision is set by the size of deviation from an estimate that still leads to performance within requirements when using that decision. It is sometimes difficult to judge how much robustness is needed or sufficient. However, according to info-gap theory,  the ranking of feasible decisions in terms of their degree of robustness is independent of such judgments.

Info-gap theory also proposes an opportuneness function which evaluates the potential for windfall outcomes resulting from favorable uncertainty.

Example: resource allocation

Resource allocation
Suppose you are a project manager, supervising two teams: orange and white. Some revenue at the end of the year will be achieved. You have a limited timescale, and you aim to decide how to space these resources between the orange and white, so that the total revenues are large.

Introducing uncertainty
The actual revenue may be different. For uncertainty level we can define an envelope. Lower uncertainty would correspond to a smaller envelope.

These envelopes are called info-gap models of uncertainty, since they describe one's understanding of the uncertainty surrounding the revenue functions.

We can find a model for the total revenue. Figure 5 shows the info-gap model of the total revenue.

Robustness
High revenues would typically earn a project manager the senior management's respect, but if the total revenues are below a certain threshold, it will cost said project manager's job. We will define such a threshold as a critical revenue, since total revenues beneath the critical revenue will be considered as failure.

This is shown in Figure 6. If the uncertainty will increase, the envelope of uncertainty will become more inclusive, to include instances of the total revenue function that, for the specific allocation, yields a revenue smaller than the critical revenue.

The robustness measures the immunity of a decision to failure. A robust satisficer is a decision maker that prefers choices with higher robustness.

If, for some allocation , the correlation between the critical revenue and the robustness is illustrated, the result is a graph somewhat similar to that in Figure 7. This graph, called robustness curve of allocation , has two important features, that are common to (most) robustness curves:

 The curve is non-increasing. This captures the notion that when higher requirements (higher critical revenue) are in place, failure to meet the target is more likely (lower robustness). This is the tradeoff between quality and robustness.
 At the nominal revenue, that is, when the critical revenue equals the revenue under the nominal model (the estimate of the revenue functions), the robustness is zero. This is since a slight deviation from the estimate may decrease the total revenue.

The decision depends on the value of failure.

Opportuneness
As well as the threat of losing your job, the senior management offers you a carrot: if the revenues are higher than some revenue, you will be rewarded.

If the uncertainty will decrease, the envelope of uncertainty will become less inclusive, to exclude all instances of the total revenue function that, for the specific allocation, yields a revenue higher than the windfall revenue.

If, for some allocation , we will illustrate the correlation between the windfall revenue and the robustness, we will have a graph somewhat similar to Figure 10. This graph, called opportuneness curve of allocation , has two important features, that are common to (most) opportuneness curves:

 The curve is non-decreasing. This captures the notion that when we have higher requirements (higher windfall revenue), we are more immune to failure (higher opportuneness, which is less desirable). That is, we need a more substantial deviation from the estimate in order to achieve our ambitious goal. This is the tradeoff between quality and opportuneness.
 At the nominal revenue, that is, when the critical revenue equals the revenue under the nominal model (our estimate of the revenue functions), the opportuneness is zero. This is since no deviation from the estimate is needed in order to achieve the windfall revenue.

Treatment of severe uncertainty 

Note that in addition to the results generated by the estimate,  two "possible" true values of the revenue are also displayed at a distance from the estimate.

As indicated by the picture, since info-gap robustness model applies its Maximin analysis in an immediate neighborhood of the estimate, there is no assurance that the analysis is in fact conducted in the neighborhood of the true value of the revenue. In fact, under conditions of severe uncertainty this—methodologically speaking—is very unlikely.

This raises the question: how valid/useful/meaningful are the results? Aren't we sweeping the severity of the uncertainty under the carpet?

For example, suppose that a given  allocation is found to be very fragile in the neighborhood of the estimate. Does this mean that this allocation is also fragile elsewhere in the region of uncertainty? Conversely, what guarantee is there that an allocation that is robust in the neighborhood of the estimate is also robust elsewhere in the region of uncertainty, indeed in the neighborhood of the true value of the revenue?

More fundamentally, given that the results generated by info-gap are based on a local revenue/allocation analysis in the neighborhood of an estimate that is likely to be substantially wrong, we have no other choice—methodologically speaking—but to assume that the results generated by this analysis are equally likely to be substantially wrong. In other words, in accordance with the universal Garbage In - Garbage Out Axiom, we have to assume that the quality of the results generated by info-gap's analysis is only as good as the quality of the estimate on which the results are based.

The picture speaks for itself.

What emerges then is that info-gap theory is yet to explain in what way, if any,  it actually attempts to deal with the severity of the uncertainty under consideration. Subsequent sections of this article will address this severity issue and its methodological and practical implications.

A more detailed analysis of an illustrative numerical investment problem of this type can be found in Sniedovich (2007).

Uncertainty models 
Info-gaps are quantified by info-gap models of uncertainty. An info-gap model is an unbounded family of nested sets. For example, a frequently encountered example is a family of nested ellipsoids all having the same shape. The structure of the sets in an info-gap model derives from the information about the uncertainty. In general terms, the structure of an info-gap model of uncertainty is chosen to define the smallest or strictest family of sets whose elements are consistent with the prior information. Since there is, usually, no known worst case, the family of sets may be unbounded.

A common example of an info-gap model is the fractional error model. The following unbounded family of nested sets of functions is a fractional-error info-gap model:

However, the horizon of uncertainty is unknown, so the info-gap model is an unbounded family of sets, and there is no worst case or greatest deviation.

There are many other types of info-gap models of uncertainty. All info-gap models obey two basic axioms:

Nesting. The info-gap model  is nested if  implies that:

Contraction. The info-gap model  is a singleton set containing its center point:

The nesting axiom imposes the property of "clustering" which is characteristic of info-gap uncertainty. Furthermore, the nesting axiom implies that the uncertainty sets  become more inclusive as  grows, thus endowing  with its meaning as a horizon of uncertainty. The contraction axiom implies that, at horizon of uncertainty zero, the estimate  is correct.

Recall that the uncertain element  may be a parameter, vector, function or set. The info-gap model is then an unbounded family of nested sets of parameters, vectors, functions or sets.

Sublevel sets 
For a fixed point estimate  an info-gap model is often equivalent to a function  defined as:

meaning "the uncertainty of a point u is the minimum uncertainty such that u is in the set with that uncertainty". In this case, the family of sets  can be recovered as the sublevel sets of :

meaning: "the nested subset with horizon of uncertainty  consists of all points with uncertainty less than or equal to ".

Conversely, given a function  satisfying the axiom  (equivalently,  if and only if ), it defines an info-gap model via the sublevel sets.

For instance, if the region of uncertainty is a metric space, then the uncertainty function can simply be the distance,  so the nested subsets are simply

This always defines an info-gap model, as distances are always non-negative (axiom of non-negativity), and satisfies  (info-gap axiom of contraction) because the distance between two points is zero if and only if they are equal (the identity of indiscernibles); nesting follows by construction of sublevel set.

Robustness and opportuneness 
Uncertainty may be either pernicious or propitious. That is, uncertain variations may be either adverse or favorable. Adversity entails the possibility of failure, while favorability is the opportunity for sweeping success. Info-gap decision theory is based on quantifying these two aspects of uncertainty, and choosing an action which addresses one or the other or both of them simultaneously. The pernicious and propitious aspects of uncertainty are quantified by two "immunity functions": the robustness function expresses the immunity to failure, while the opportuneness function expresses the immunity to windfall gain.

Robustness and opportuneness functions 
The robustness function expresses the greatest level of uncertainty at which failure cannot occur; the opportuneness function is the least level of uncertainty which entails the possibility of sweeping success. The robustness and opportuneness functions address, respectively, the pernicious and propitious facets of uncertainty.

Let  be a decision vector of parameters such as design variables, time of initiation, model parameters or operational options. We can verbally express the robustness and opportuneness functions as the maximum or minimum of a set of values of the uncertainty parameter  of an info-gap model:
{| width="100%" border="0"
|
| (robustness)
| (1a)
|-
|
| (opportuneness)
| (2a)
|}
Formally,
{| width="100%" border="0"
|
| (robustness)
| (1b)
|-
|
| (opportuneness)
| (2b)
|}

We can "read" eq. (1) as follows. Robustness is defined as a worst-case scenario up to the horizon of uncertainty: how large can the horizon of uncertainty be and still, even in the worst case, achieve the critical level of outcome?

Eq. (2) states that the opportuneness 
A small value of  reflects the opportune situation that
great reward is possible even in the presence of little ambient uncertainty. Opportuneness is defined as a best-case scenario up to the horizon of uncertainty: how small can the horizon of uncertainty be and still, in the best case, achieve the windfall reward?

The immunity functions — robustness and opportuneness — are the basic decision functions in info-gap decision theory.

Optimization 
The robustness function involves a maximization, but not of the performance or outcome of the decision: in general the outcome could be arbitrarily bad. Rather, it maximizes the level of uncertainty that would be required for the outcome to fail.

The greatest tolerable uncertainty is found at which decision  satisfices the performance at a critical survival-level. One may establish one's preferences among the available actions  according to their robustnesses , whereby larger robustness engenders higher preference. In this way the robustness function underlies a satisficing decision algorithm which maximizes the immunity to pernicious uncertainty.

The opportuneness function in eq. (2) involves a minimization, however not, as might be expected, of the damage which can accrue from unknown adverse events. The least horizon of uncertainty is sought at which decision  enables (but does not necessarily guarantee) large windfall gain. Unlike the robustness function, the opportuneness function does not satisfice, it "windfalls". Windfalling preferences are those which prefer actions for which the opportuneness function takes a small value. When  is used to choose an action , one is "windfalling" by optimizing the opportuneness from propitious uncertainty in an attempt to enable highly ambitious goals or rewards.

Given a scalar reward function , depending on the decision vector  and the info-gap-uncertain function , the minimal requirement in eq. (1) is that the reward  be no less than a critical value . Likewise, the sweeping success in eq. Rather, these parameters enable the decision maker to explore a range of options. In any case the windfall reward  is greater, usually much greater, than the critical reward :

The robustness and opportuneness functions of eqs. (1) and (2) can now be expressed more explicitly:
{| border="0" width="100%"
| 
| (3)
|-
|
| (4)
|}
The complementary or anti-symmetric structure of the immunity functions is evident from eqs. (3) and (4).

These definitions can be modified to handle multi-criterion reward functions. Likewise, analogous definitions apply when  is a loss rather than a reward.

Decision rules 
Based on these function, one can then decided on a course of action by optimizing for uncertainty: choose the decision which is most robust (can withstand the greatest uncertainty; "satisficing"), or choose the decision which requires the least uncertainty to achieve a windfall.

Formally, optimizing for robustness or optimizing for opportuneness yields a preference relation on the set of decisions, and the decision rule is the "optimize with respect to this preference".

In the below, let  be the set of all available or feasible decision vectors .

Robust-satisficing 
The robustness function generates robust-satisficing preferences on the options: decisions are ranked in increasing order of robustness, for a given critical reward, i.e., by  value, meaning  if 

A robust-satisficing decision is one which maximizes the robustness and satisfices the performance at the critical level .

Usually, though not invariably, the robust-satisficing action  depends on the critical reward .

Opportune-windfalling 
Conversely, one may optimize opportuneness:
the opportuneness function generates opportune-windfalling preferences on the options: decisions are ranked in decreasing order of opportuneness, for a given windfall reward, i.e., by  value, meaning  if 

The opportune-windfalling decision, minimizes the opportuneness function on the set of available decisions.

The two preference rankings, as well as the corresponding the optimal decisions

Applications 
Info-gap theory has generated a lot of literature. Info-gap theory has been studied or applied in a range of applications including engineering, 

biological conservation,
 

 theoretical biology, homeland security, economics, 
project management

and statistics. Foundational issues related to info-gap theory have also been studied.

The remainder of this section describes in a little more detail the kind of uncertainties addressed by info-gap theory. Although many published works are mentioned below, no attempt is made here to present insights from these papers. The emphasis is not upon elucidation of the  concepts of info-gap theory, but upon the context where it is used and the goals.

Engineering 
A typical engineering application is the vibration analysis of a cracked beam, where the location, size, shape and orientation of the crack is unknown and greatly influence the vibration dynamics. Very little is usually known about these spatial and geometrical uncertainties. The info-gap analysis allows one to model these uncertainties, and to determine the degree of robustness - to these uncertainties - of properties such as vibration amplitude, natural frequencies, and natural modes of vibration. Another example is the structural design of a building subject to uncertain loads such as from wind or earthquakes. The response of the structure depends strongly on the spatial and temporal distribution of the loads. However, storms and earthquakes are highly idiosyncratic events, and the interaction between the event and the structure involves very site-specific mechanical properties which are rarely known. The info-gap analysis enables the design of the structure to enhance structural immunity against uncertain deviations from design-base or estimated worst-case loads. Another engineering application involves the design of a neural net for detecting faults in a mechanical system, based on real-time measurements. A major difficulty is that faults are highly idiosyncratic, so that training data for the neural net will tend to differ substantially from data obtained from real-time faults after the net has been trained. The info-gap robustness strategy enables one to design the neural net to be robust to the disparity between training data and future real events.

Biology 
The conservation biologist faces info-gaps in using biological models. They use info-gap robustness curves to select among management options for spruce-budworm populations in Eastern Canada. Burgman
 uses the fact that the robustness curves of different alternatives can intersect.

Project management 
Project management is another area where info-gap uncertainty is common. The project manager often has very limited information about the duration and cost of some of the tasks in the project, and info-gap robustness can assist in project planning and integration. Financial economics is another area where the future is fraught with surprises, which may be either pernicious or propitious. Info-gap robustness and opportuneness analyses can assist in portfolio design, credit rationing, and other applications.

Limitations 
In applying info-gap theory, one must remain aware of certain limitations.

Firstly, info-gap makes assumptions, namely on universe in question, and the degree of uncertainty – the info-gap model is a model of degrees of uncertainty or similarity of various assumptions, within a given universe. Info-gap does not make probability assumptions within this universe – it is non-probabilistic – but does quantify a notion of "distance from the estimate". In brief, info-gap makes fewer assumptions than a probabilistic method, but does make some assumptions.

For instance, a simple model of daily stock market returns – which by definition fall in the range  – may include extreme moves such as Black Monday (1987) but might not model the market breakdowns following the September 11 attacks: it considers the "known unknowns", not the "unknown unknowns". This is a general criticism of much decision theory, and is by no means specific to info-gap, but info-gap is not immune to it.

Secondly, there is no natural scale: is uncertainty of  small or large? Different models of uncertainty give different scales, and require judgment and understanding of the domain and the model of uncertainty. Similarly, measuring differences between outcomes requires judgment and understanding of the domain.

Thirdly, if the universe under consideration is larger than a significant horizon of uncertainty, and outcomes for these distant points are significantly different from points near the estimate, then conclusions of robustness or opportuneness analyses will generally be: "one must be very confident of one's assumptions, else outcomes may be expected to vary significantly from projections" – a cautionary conclusion.

Disclaimer and summary
The robustness and opportuneness functions can inform decision. For example, a change in decision increasing robustness may increase or decrease opportuneness. From a subjective stance, robustness and opportuneness both trade-off against aspiration for outcome: robustness and opportuneness deteriorate as the decision maker's aspirations increase. Robustness is zero for model-best anticipated outcomes. Robustness curves for alternative decisions may cross as a function of aspiration, implying reversal of preference.

Various theorems identify conditions where larger info-gap robustness implies larger probability of success, regardless of the underlying probability distribution. However, these conditions are technical, and do not translate into any common-sense, verbal recommendations, limiting such applications of info-gap theory by non-experts.

Criticism 
A general criticism of non-probabilistic decision rules, discussed in detail at decision theory: alternatives to probability theory, is that optimal decision rules (formally, admissible decision rules) can always be derived by probabilistic methods, with a suitable utility function and prior distribution (this is the statement of the complete class theorems), and thus that non-probabilistic methods such as info-gap are unnecessary and do not yield new or better decision rules.

A more general criticism of decision making under uncertainty is the impact of outsized, unexpected events, ones that are not captured by the model. This is discussed particularly in black swan theory, and info-gap, used in isolation, is vulnerable to this, as are a fortiori all decision theories that use a fixed universe of possibilities, notably probabilistic ones.

Sniedovich raises two points to info-gap decision theory, one substantive, one scholarly:
1. the info-gap uncertainty model is flawed and oversold One should consider the range of possibilities, not its subsets. Sniedovich argues that info-gap decision theory is therefore a "voodoo decision theory."
2. info-gap is maximin Ben-Haim states (Ben-Haim 1999, pp. 271–2) that "robust reliability is emphatically not a [min-max] worst-case analysis". Note that Ben-Haim compares info-gap to minimax, while Sniedovich considers it a case of maximin.

Sniedovich has challenged the validity of info-gap theory for making decisions under severe uncertainty.

Maximin 
Symbolically, max  assuming min (worst-case) outcome, or maximin.

In other words, while it is not a maximin analysis of outcome over the universe of uncertainty, it is a maximin analysis over a properly construed decision space.

Ben-Haim argues that info-gap's robustness model is not min-max/maximin analysis because it is not worst-case analysis of outcomes; it is a satisficing model, not an optimization model – a (straightforward) maximin analysis would consider worst-case outcomes over the entire space which, since uncertainty is often potentially unbounded, would yield an unbounded bad worst case.

Stability radius 

Sniedovich has shown that info-gap's robustness model is a simple stability radius model, namely a local stability model of the generic form

In other words, info-gap's robustness model is a stability radius model characterized by a stability requirement of the form . Since stability radius models are designed for the analysis of small perturbations in a given nominal value of a parameter, Sniedovich argues that info-gap's robustness model is unsuitable for the treatment of severe uncertainty characterized by a poor estimate and a vast uncertainty space.

Discussion

Satisficing and bounded rationality 
It is correct that the info-gap robustness function is local, and has restricted quantitative value in some cases. However, a major purpose of decision analysis is to provide focus for subjective judgments. That is, regardless of the formal analysis, a framework for discussion is provided. Without entering into any particular framework, or characteristics of frameworks in general, discussion follows about proposals for such frameworks.

Simon  
introduced the idea of bounded rationality. Limitations on knowledge, understanding, and computational capability constrain the ability of decision makers to identify optimal choices. Simon advocated satisficing rather than optimizing: seeking adequate (rather than optimal) outcomes given available resources. Schwartz,
Conlisk

and others discuss extensive evidence for the phenomenon of bounded rationality among human decision makers, as well as for the advantages of satisficing when knowledge and understanding are deficient. The info-gap robustness function provides a means of implementing a satisficing strategy under bounded rationality. For instance, in discussing bounded rationality and satisficing in conservation and environmental management, Burgman notes that "Info-gap theory ... can function sensibly when there are 'severe' knowledge gaps." The info-gap robustness and opportuneness functions provide "a formal framework to explore the kinds of speculations that occur intuitively when examining decision options."
 Burgman then proceeds to develop an info-gap robust-satisficing strategy for protecting the endangered orange-bellied parrot. Similarly, Vinot, Cogan and Cipolla  discuss engineering design and note that "the downside of a model-based analysis lies in the knowledge that the model behavior is only an approximation to the real system behavior. Hence the question of the honest designer: how sensitive is my measure of design success to uncertainties in my system representation? ... It is evident that if model-based analysis is to be used with any level of confidence then ... [one must] attempt to satisfy an acceptable sub-optimal level of performance while remaining maximally robust to the system uncertainties." They proceed to develop an info-gap robust-satisficing design procedure for an aerospace application.

Alternatives
Of course, decision in the face of uncertainty is nothing new, and attempts to deal with it have a long history. A number of authors have noted and discussed similarities and differences between info-gap robustness and minimax or worst-case methods
   
   
.   
Sniedovich    
has demonstrated formally that the info-gap robustness function can be represented as a maximin optimization, and is thus related to Wald's minimax theory. Sniedovich  has claimed that info-gap's robustness analysis is conducted in the neighborhood of an estimate that is likely to be substantially wrong, concluding that the resulting robustness function is equally likely to be substantially wrong.    
   
On the other hand, the estimate is the best one has, so it is useful to know if it can err greatly and still yield an acceptable outcome. This critical question clearly raises the issue of whether robustness (as defined by info-gap theory) is qualified to judge whether confidence is warranted,    
 and how it compares to methods used to inform decisions under uncertainty using considerations not limited to the neighborhood of a bad initial guess. Answers to these questions vary with the particular problem at hand. Some general comments follow.

Sensitivity analysis 

Sensitivity analysis – how sensitive conclusions are to input assumptions – can be performed independently of a model of uncertainty: most simply, one may take two different assumed values for an input and compares the conclusions. From this perspective, info-gap can be seen as a technique of sensitivity analysis, though by no means the only.

Robust optimization 

The robust optimization literature  provides methods and techniques that take a global approach to robustness analysis. These methods directly address decision under severe uncertainty, and have been used for this purpose for more than thirty years now. Wald's Maximin model is the main instrument used by these methods.   
   
The principal difference between the Maximin model employed by info-gap and the various Maximin models employed by robust optimization methods is in the manner in which the total region of uncertainty is incorporated in the robustness model. Info-gap takes a local approach that concentrates on the immediate neighborhood of the estimate. In sharp contrast, robust optimization methods set out to incorporate in the analysis the entire region of uncertainty, or at least an adequate representation thereof. In fact, some of these methods do not even use an estimate.

Comparative analysis

Classical decision theory, offers two approaches to decision-making under severe uncertainty, namely maximin and Laplaces' principle of insufficient reason (assume all outcomes equally likely); these may be considered alternative solutions to the problem info-gap addresses.

Further, as discussed at decision theory: alternatives to probability theory, probabilists, particularly Bayesians probabilists, argue that optimal decision rules (formally, admissible decision rules) can always be derived by probabilistic methods (this is the statement of the complete class theorems), and thus that non-probabilistic methods such as info-gap are unnecessary and do not yield new or better decision rules.

Maximin 
As attested by the rich literature on robust optimization, maximin provides a wide range of methods for decision making in the face of severe uncertainty.

Indeed, as discussed in criticism of info-gap decision theory, info-gap's robustness model can be interpreted as an instance of the general maximin model.

Bayesian analysis 
As for Laplaces' principle of insufficient reason, in this context it is convenient to view it as an instance of Bayesian analysis.

The essence of the Bayesian analysis is applying probabilities for different possible realizations of the uncertain parameters. In the case of Knightian (non-probabilistic) uncertainty, these probabilities represent the decision maker's "degree of belief" in a specific realization.

In our example, suppose there are only five possible realizations of the uncertain revenue to allocation function. The decision maker believes that the estimated function is the most likely, and that the likelihood decreases as the difference from the estimate increases. Figure 11 exemplifies such a probability distribution.

Now, for any allocation, one can construct a probability distribution of the revenue, based on his prior beliefs. The decision maker can then choose the allocation with the highest expected revenue, with the lowest probability for an unacceptable revenue, etc.

The most problematic step of this analysis is the choice of the realizations probabilities. When there is an extensive and relevant past experience, an expert may use this experience to construct a probability distribution.

Nevertheless, methodologically speaking, this difficulty is not as problematic as  basing the analysis of a problem subject to severe uncertainty on a single point estimate and its immediate neighborhood, as done by info-gap. And what is more, contrary to info-gap, this approach is global, rather than local.

Still, it must be stressed that Bayesian analysis does not expressly concern itself with the question of robustness.

Bayesian analysis raises the issue of learning from experience and adjusting probabilities accordingly. In other words, decision is not a one-stop process, but profits from a sequence of decisions and observations.

Classical decision theory perspective 
Sniedovich raises two points to info-gap, from the point of view of classical decision theory, one substantive, one scholarly:
the info-gap uncertainty model is flawed and oversold Under severe uncertainty, one should use global decision theory , not local decision theory.
info-gap is maximin Ben-Haim (2006, p.xii) claims that info-gap is "radically different from all current theories of decision under uncertainty,". Ben-Haim states (Ben-Haim 1999, pp. 271–2) that "robust reliability is emphatically not a [min-max] worst-case analysis".

Sniedovich has challenged the validity of info-gap theory for making decisions under severe uncertainty.

In the framework of classical decision theory, info-gap's robustness model can be construed as an instance of Wald's Maximin model and its opportuneness model is an instance of the classical Minimin model. Both operate in the neighborhood of an estimate of the parameter of interest whose true value is subject to severe uncertainty and therefore is likely to be substantially wrong. Moreover, the considerations brought to bear upon the decision process itself also originate in the locality of this unreliable estimate, and so may or may not be reflective of the entire range of decisions and uncertainties.

Background, working assumptions, and a look ahead 

Now, as portrayed in the info-gap literature, Info-Gap was designed expressly as a methodology for solving decision problems that are subject to severe uncertainty.  And what is more, its aim is to seek solutions that are robust.

Thus, to have a clear picture of info-gap's modus operandi and its role and place in decision theory and robust optimization, it is imperative to examine it within this context.  In other words, it is necessary to establish info-gap's relation to classical decision theory and robust optimization. 
To this end, the following questions must be addressed:
 What are the characteristics of decision problems that are subject to severe uncertainty?
 What difficulties arise in the modelling and solution of such problems?
 What type of robustness is sought?
 How does info-gap theory address these issues?
 In what way is info-gap decision theory similar to and/or different from other theories for decision under uncertainty?

Two important points need to be elucidated in this regard at the outset:
 Considering the severity of the uncertainty that info-gap was designed to tackle, it is essential to clarify the difficulties posed by severe uncertainty.
 Since info-gap is a non-probabilistic method that seeks to maximize robustness to uncertainty, it is imperative to compare it to the single most important "non-probabilistic" model in classical decision theory, namely Wald's Maximin paradigm (Wald 1945, 1950).  After all, this paradigm has dominated the scene in classical decision theory for well over sixty years now.

So, first let us clarify the assumptions that are implied by severe uncertainty.

Working assumptions 

Info-gap decision theory employs three simple constructs to capture the uncertainty associated with decision problems:
 A parameter  whose true value is subject to severe uncertainty.
 A region of uncertainty  where the true value of  lies.

It should be pointed out, though, that as such these constructs are generic, meaning that they can be employed to model situations where the uncertainty is not severe but mild, indeed very mild.  So it is vital to be clear that to give apt expression to the  severity of the uncertainty, in the Info-Gap framework these three constructs  are given specific meaning.
 The region of uncertainty  is relatively large. In fact, Ben-Haim (2006, p. 210) indicates that in the context of info-gap decision theory most of the commonly encountered regions of uncertainty are unbounded.

The point to note here is that conditions of severe uncertainty entail that the estimate   can—relatively speaking—be very distant from the true value . This is particularly pertinent for methodologies, like info-gap,  that seek robustness to uncertainty. Indeed, assuming otherwise  would—methodologically speaking—be tantamount to engaging in wishful thinking.

Wald's Maximin paradigm 

The basic idea behind this famous paradigm can be expressed in plain language as follows:
We are to adopt the alternative the worst outcome of which is superior to the worst outcome of the others.Rawls(1971, p. 152)

Thus,  according to this paradigm,  in the framework of decision-making under severe uncertainty, the robustness of an alternative is a measure of how well this alternative can cope with the worst uncertain outcome that it can generate. Needless to say, this attitude towards severe uncertainty often leads to the selection of highly conservative alternatives.  This is precisely the reason that this paradigm is not always a satisfactory methodology for decision-making under severe uncertainty (Tintner 1952).

As indicated in the overview, info-gap's robustness model is a Maximin model in disguise. More specifically, it is a simple instance of Wald's Maximin model where:
 The region of uncertainty associated with an alternative decision is an immediate neighborhood of the estimate .
 The uncertain outcomes of an alternative are determined by a characteristic function of the performance requirement under consideration.

Thus, aside from the conservatism issue, a far more serious issue must be addressed.  This is the validity issue arising from  the local  nature of info-gap's robustness analysis.

Local vs global robustness 

The validity of the results generated by info-gap's robustness analysis are contingent on the quality of the estimate . According to info-gap's own working assumptions, this estimate is poor and likely to be substantially wrong (Ben-Haim, 2006, p. 280-281).

The trouble with this feature of info-gap's robustness model is brought out more forcefully by the picture. The white circle represents the immediate neighborhood of the estimate  on which the Maximin analysis is conducted.

So given the severity of the uncertainty under consideration, how valid/useful can this type of Maximin analysis really be?

What extent a local robustness analysis a la Maximin in the immediate neighborhood of a poor estimate can aptly represent a large region of uncertainty.

Robust optimization methods invariably take a far more global view of robustness. So much so that scenario planning and scenario generation are central issues in this area. This reflects a strong commitment to an adequate representation of the entire region of uncertainty in the definition of robustness and in the robustness analysis itself.

This has to do with the portrayal of info-gap's contribution to the state of the art in decision theory, and its role and place vis-a-vis other methodologies.

Role and place in decision theory 

Info-gap is emphatic about its advancement of the state of the art in decision theory (color is used here for emphasis):
Info-gap decision theory is radically different from all current theories of decision under uncertainty. The difference originates in the modelling of uncertainty as an information gap rather than as a probability.  Ben-Haim (2006, p.xii)

In this book we concentrate on the fairly new concept of information-gap uncertainty, whose differences from more classical approaches to uncertainty are real and deep. Despite the power of classical decision theories, in many areas such as engineering, economics, management, medicine and public policy, a need has arisen for a different format for decisions based on severely uncertain evidence. Ben-Haim (2006, p. 11)   
 

These strong claims must be substantiated. In particular, a clear-cut, unequivocal answer must be given to the following question: in what way is info-gap's generic robustness model different, indeed radically different, from worst-case analysis a la  Maximin?

Subsequent sections of this article describe various aspects of info-gap decision theory and its applications, how it  proposes to cope with the working assumptions outlined above, the local nature of info-gap's robustness analysis and its intimate  relationship with Wald's classical Maximin paradigm and worst-case analysis.

Invariance property 

The main point to keep in mind here is that info-gap's raison d'être is to provide a methodology for decision under severe uncertainty.  This means that its primary test would be in the efficacy of its handling of and coping with  severe uncertainty.  To this end it must be established first how Info-Gap's robustness/opportuneness models behave/fare, as the severity of the uncertainty is increased/decreased.

Second, it must be established whether info-gap's robustness/opportuneness models give adequate expression to the potential variability of the performance function over the entire region of uncertainty.  This is particularly important because Info—Gap is usually concerned with relatively large, indeed unbounded, regions of uncertainty.

So, let  denote the total region of uncertainty and consider these key questions:
 How does the robustness/opportuneness analysis respond to an increase/decrease in the size of ?
 How does an increase/decrease in the size of  affect the robustness or opportuneness of a decision?
 How representative are the results generated by info-gap's robustness/opportuneness analysis of what occurs in the relatively large total region of uncertainty ?

Consider then the following result which is a direct consequence of the local nature of info-gap's robustness/opportuneness analysis and the nesting property of info-gaps' regions of uncertainty (Sniedovich 2007):

Invariance theorem 
The robustness of decision  is invariant with the size of the total region of uncertainty  for all  such that 
{| width="70%" border="0"
| (7)
|  for some                
|}

In other words, for any given decision, info-gap's analysis yields the same results for all total regions of uncertainty that contain . This applies to both the robustness and opportuneness models.

In short, by dint of focusing exclusively on the immediate neighborhood of the estimate  info-gap's robustness/opportuneness models are inherently local.

The picture is this:

where the term  "No man's land"   refers to the part of the total region of uncertainty that is outside the region .

Note that in this case the robustness of decision  is based on its (worst-case) performance over no more than a minuscule part of the total region of uncertainty that is an immediate neighborhood of the estimate . Since usually info-gap's total region of uncertainty is unbounded, this illustration represents a usual   case rather than an exception.

Info-gap's robustness/opportuneness are by definition local properties.  As such they cannot assess the performance of decisions over the total region of uncertainty. For this reason it is not clear how Info-Gap's Robustness/Opportuneness models can provide a meaningful/sound/useful basis for decision under severe uncertainty where the estimate is poor and is likely to be substantially wrong.

This crucial issue is addressed in subsequent sections of this article.

Maximin/Minimin: playing robustness/opportuneness games with Nature 

For well over sixty years now  Wald's  Maximin  model has figured in classical decision theory and related areas – such as robust optimization - as the foremost non-probabilistic paradigm for modeling and treatment of severe uncertainty.

Info-gap is propounded (e.g. Ben-Haim 2001, 2006) as a new non-probabilistic theory that is radically different from all current decision theories for decision under uncertainty. So, it is imperative to examine in this discussion  in what way, if any, is info-gap's robustness model radically different from Maximin. For one thing, there is a well-established assessment of the utility of Maximin. For example, Berger (Chapter 5) suggests that even in situations where no prior information is available (a best case for Maximin), Maximin can lead to bad decision rules and be hard to implement. He recommends Bayesian methodology. And as indicated above,
It should also be remarked that the minimax principle even if it is applicable leads to an extremely conservative policy.
Tintner (1952, p. 25)
  
However, quite apart from the ramifications that establishing this point might have for the utility of info-gaps' robustness model, the reason that it behooves us to clarify the relationship between info-gap and Maximin is the centrality of the latter in decision theory.  After all, this is a major classical decision methodology.  So, any theory claiming to furnish a new non-probabilistic methodology for decision under severe uncertainty would be expected to be compared to this stalwart of decision theory.  And yet, not only is a comparison of info-gap's robustness model to Maximin absent from the three books expounding info-gap  (Ben-Haim 1996, 2001, 2006), Maximin is not even mentioned in them as the major decision theoretic methodology for severe uncertainty that it is. 
 
Elsewhere in the info-gap literature, one can find discussions dealing with similarities and differences between these two paradigms, as well as discussions on the relationship between info-gap and worst-case analysis,
However, the general impression is that the intimate connection between these two paradigms has not been identified.  Indeed, the opposite is argued. For instance, Ben-Haim (2005) argues that info-gap's robustness model is similar to  Maximin but, is not a Maximin model.

The following quote eloquently expresses Ben-Haim's assessment of info-gap's relationship to Maximin and it provides ample motivation for the analysis that follows.
We note that robust reliability is emphatically  not  a worst-case analysis. In classical worst-case min-max analysis the designer minimizes the impact of the maximally damaging case. But an info-gap model of uncertainty is an unbounded family of nested sets: , for all  . What Eq. (1) expresses is the greatest level of uncertainty consistent with no-failure. When the designer chooses q to maximize   he is maximizing his immunity to an unbounded ambient uncertainty. The closest this comes to "min-maxing" is that the design is chosen so that "bad" events (causing reward  less than ) occur as "far away" as possible (beyond a maximized value of  ).
 Ben-Haim, 1999, pp. 271–2

The point to note here is that this statement misses the fact that the horizon of uncertainty  is bounded above (implicitly) by the performance requirement
 
and that info-gap conducts its worst-case analysis—one analysis at a time for a given   -- within each of the regions of uncertainty  .

In short, given the discussions in the info-gap literature on this issue, it is obvious that the kinship between info-gap's robustness model and Wald's Maximin model, as well as info-gap's kinship with other models of classical decision theory must be brought to light. So,  the  objective in this section is to place info-gap's robustness and opportuneness models in their proper context, namely within the wider frameworks of classical decision theory and robust optimization.

The discussion is based on the classical decision theoretic perspective outlined by Sniedovich (2007) and on standard texts in this area (e.g. Resnik 1987, French 1988).

 Certain parts of the exposition that follows have a mathematical slant.  This is unavoidable because info-gap's models are mathematical.

Generic models 

The basic conceptual framework that classical decision theory provides for dealing with uncertainty is that of a two-player game.  The two players are the decision maker (DM) and Nature, where Nature represents uncertainty. More specifically, Nature represents the DM's attitude towards uncertainty and risk.

Note that a clear distinction is made in this regard between a pessimistic decision maker and an optimistic decision maker,  namely between a worst-case attitude and a best-case attitude. A pessimistic decision maker assumes that Nature plays against him whereas an optimistic decision maker assumes that Nature plays with him.

To express these intuitive notions mathematically, classical decision theory uses a simple model consisting of the following three constructs:
  A set  representing the decision space available to the DM.
 A function  stipulating the outcomes generated by the  decision-state pairs .

The function  is called objective function, payoff function, return function, cost function  etc.

The decision-making process (game) defined by these objects consists of three steps:
  Step 1: The DM selects a decision  .
 Step 2: In response, given ,  Nature  selects a state .
 Step 3: The outcome  is allotted to DM.

Note that in contrast to games considered in classical game theory, here the first player (DM) moves first so that the second player (Nature) knows what decision was selected by the first player prior to selecting her decision. Thus, the conceptual and technical complications regarding the existence of Nash equilibrium point are not pertinent here. Nature is not an independent player, it is a conceptual device describing the DM's attitude towards uncertainty and risk.

At first sight, the simplicity of this framework may strike one as naive.  Yet, as attested by the variety of specific instances that it encompasses it is rich in possibilities, flexible, and versatile. For the purposes of this discussion it suffices to consider the following classical generic setup:

 

If  then the game is cooperative, and if  then the game is non-cooperative.  Thus, this format represents four cases: two non-cooperative games (Maximin and Minimax) and two cooperative games (Minimin, and Maximax). The respective formulations are as follows:

 

Each case is specified by a pair of optimality criteria employed by DM and Nature. For example, Maximin depicts a situation where DM strives to maximize the outcome and Nature strives to minimize it. Similarly, the Minimin paradigm represents situations where both DM and Nature are striving to in minimize the outcome.

Of particular interest to this discussion are the Maximin and Minimin paradigms because they subsume info-gap's robustness and opportuneness models, respectively. So, here they are:
  Step 1: The DM selects a decision   with a view to maximize the outcome .
 Step 3: The outcome  is allotted to DM.

 Step 1: The DM selects a decision   with a view to minimizes the outcome .
 Step 3: The outcome  is allotted to DM.

With this in mind,  consider now info-gap's robustness and opportuneness models.

Info-gap's robustness model 

In this context the worst value of  pertaining to a given  pair  is a  that violates the performance requirement .

There are various ways to incorporate the DM's objective and Nature's antagonistic response in a single outcome. For instance, one can use the following characteristic function for this purpose:

Note that, as desired, for any triplet  of interest we have

hence from the DM's point of view satisficing the performance constraint is equivalent to maximizing   .

In short,  
 Step 1: The DM selects a horizon of uncertainty   with a view to maximize the outcome .
 Step 3: The outcome  is allotted to DM.
 
Clearly, the DM's optimal alternative is to select the largest value of  such that the worst  satisfies the performance requirement.

Maximin Theorem 
As shown in Sniedovich (2007), Info-gap's robustness model is a simple instance of Wald's maximin model. Specifically,

Info-gap's opportuneness model 

By the same token,  info-gap's opportuneness model is a simple instance of the generic Minimin model. That is,

where

observing that, as desired, for any triplet  of interest we have

Nature's behavior is a reflection of her sympathetic stance here.

Remark: This attitude towards risk and uncertainty which assumes that  Nature will play  with us,  is rather naive. As noted by Resnik (1987, p. 32) "... But that rule surely would have few adherence...". Nevertheless, it is often used in combination with the Maximin rule in the formulation of Hurwicz's  optimism-pessimisim   rule (Resnik 1987, French 1988) with a view to mitigate the extreme conservatism of Maximin.

Mathematical programming formulations 

To bring out more forcefully that info-gap's robustness model is an instance of the generic Maximin model, and info-gap's opportuneness model an instance of the generic Minimin model, it is instructive to examine the equivalent so called Mathematical Programming  (MP) formats of these generic models (Ecker and Kupferschmid, 1988, pp. 24–25; Thie 1988 pp. 314–317;  Kouvelis and Yu, 1997, p. 27):

Thus, in the case of info-gap we have

To verify the equivalence between info-gap's formats and the respective decision theoretic formats, recall that, by construction, for any triplet  of interest we have

This means that in the case of robustness/Maximin, an antagonistic Nature will (effectively) minimize  by minimizing   whereas in the case of  opportuneness/Minimin a sympathetic Nature will (effectively) maximize  by minimizing .

Summary 

This of course is a typical Maximin analysis. In the parlance of classical decision theory:
 

This of course is a typical Minimin analysis. In the parlance of classical decision theory:
 

The mathematical transliterations of these concepts are straightforward, resulting in typical Maximin/Minimin models, respectively.

Far from being restrictive, the generic Maximin/Minimin models' lean structure is a blessing in disguise. The main point here is that the abstract character of the three basic constructs of the generic models
 Decision
 State
 Outcome

in effect allows for great flexibility in modeling.

A more detailed analysis is therefore required to bring out the full force of the relationship between info-gap and generic classical decision theoretic models. See #Notes on the art of math modeling.

Treasure hunt 
The following is a pictorial summary of Sniedovich's (2007) discussion on local vs global robustness. For illustrative purposes it is cast here as a Treasure Hunt. It shows how the elements of info-gap's robustness model relate to one another and how the severe uncertainty is treated in the model.

In summary:

Info-gap's robustness model is a mathematical representation of  a local worst-case analysis in the neighborhood of a given estimate of the true value of the parameter of interest. Under severe uncertainty the estimate is assumed to be a poor indication of the true value of the parameter and is likely to be substantially wrong.

The fundamental question therefore is: Given the 
 of the uncertainty
 nature of the analysis
 quality of the estimate
how meaningful and useful are the results generated by the analysis, and how sound is the methodology as a whole?

More on this criticism can be found on Sniedovich's web site.

Notes on the art of math modeling

Constraint satisficing vs payoff  optimization 

Any satisficing problem can be formulated as an optimization problem. To see that this is so, let the objective function of the optimization problem be the indicator function of the constraints pertaining to the satisficing problem. Thus, if our concern is to identify a worst-case scenario pertaining to a constraint, this can be done via a suitable Maximin/Minimax worst-case analysis of the indicator function of the constraint.

This means that the generic decision theoretic models can handle outcomes that are induced by constraint satisficing requirements rather than by say payoff maximization.

In particular, note the equivalence

where 

and therefore

In practical terms, this means that an antagonistic Nature will aim to select a state that will violate the constraint whereas a sympathetic Nature will aim to select a state that will satisfy the constraint. As for the outcome, the penalty for violating the constraint is such that the decision maker will refrain from selecting a decision that will allow Nature to violate the constraint within the state space pertaining to the selected decision.

The role of "min" and "max" 

Rather, the reason for this is a deeper one. It goes to the heart of the conceptual framework that the Maximin model captures: Nature playing against the DM. This is what is crucial here.

To see that this is so, let us generalize info-gap's robustness model and consider the following modified model instead:

Note that it is not assumed that  is a real-valued function. Also note that "min" is absent from this model.

All we need to do to incorporate a min  into this model is to express the constraint 

as a worst-case requirement. This is a straightforward task, observing that for any triplet  of interest we have  

where

hence,

which, of course, is a Maximin model a la Mathematical Programming.

In short,

Note that although the model on the left does not include an explicit "min", it is nevertheless a typical Maximin model. The feature rendering it a Maximin model is the  requirement which lends itself to an intuitive  worst-case formulation and interpretation.

In fact, the presence of a double "max" in an info-gap robustness model does not necessarily alter the fact that this model is a Maximin model. For instance, consider the robustness model

This is an instance of the following Maximin model

where

The "inner min" indicates that Nature plays against the DM—the "max" player—hence the model is a robustness model.

The nature of the info-gap/maximin/minimin connection  

This modeling issue is discussed here because claims have been made that although there is a close relationship between info-gap's robustness and opportuneness models and the generic maximin and Minimin models, respectively, the description of info-gap as an  instance of   these models is too strong.  The argument put forward is that although it is true that info-gap's robustness model can be expressed as a maximin model, the former is not an instance of the latter.

This objection apparently stems from the fact that any optimization problem can be formulated as a maximin model by a simple employment of dummy  variables. That is, clearly

 

where

 

for any arbitrary non-empty set .

The point of this objection seems to be that we are running the risk of watering down the meaning of the term instance  if we thus contend that any minimization problem is an instance of the maximin model.

It must therefore be pointed out that this concern is utterly unwarranted in the case of the info-gap/maximin/minimin relation. The correspondence between info-gap's robustness model and the generic maximin model is neither contrived nor is it formulated with the aid of dummy objects.

Specifically, as shown above, info-gap's robustness model is an instance of the generic maximin model specified by the following constructs:

 

Furthermore, those objecting to the use of the term  instance of    should note that the Maximin model formulated above has an equivalent so called  Mathematical Programming   (MP) formulation deriving from the fact that

 

where  denotes the real line.

So here are side by side info-gap's robustness model and the two equivalent formulations of the generic maximin paradigm:

 

Note that the equivalence between these three representations of the same decision-making situation makes no use of dummy variables. It is based on the equivalence

 

deriving directly from the definition of the characteristic function .

Clearly then, info-gap's robustness model is an instance of the generic maximin model.

Similarly, for info-gap's opportuneness model we have

 

Again, it should be stressed that the equivalence between these three representations of the same decision-making situation makes no use of dummy variables. It is based on the equivalence

 

deriving directly from the definition of the characteristic function .

Clearly, info-gap's opportuneness model is an instance of the generic minimin model.

Other formulations 

There are of course other valid representations of the robustness/opportuneness models.  For instance, in the case of the robustness model, the outcomes can be defined as follows (Sniedovich 2007) :

where the binary operation   is defined as follows:

The corresponding MP format of the Maximin model would then be as follows:

In words, to maximize the robustness, the DM selects the largest value of  such that the performance  constraint  is satisfied by all . In plain language: the DM selects the largest value of   whose worst outcome in the region of uncertainty of size    satisfies the performance requirement.

Simplifications 

As a rule the classical Maximin formulations are not particularly useful when it comes to solving the problems they represent, as no "general purpose" Maximin solver is available (Rustem and Howe 2002).

It is common practice therefore to simplify the classical formulation with a view to derive a formulation that would be readily amenable to solution. This is a problem-specific task which involves exploiting a problem's specific features. The mathematical programming format of Maximin is often more user-friendly in this regard.

The best example is of course the classical Maximin model of 2-person zero-sum games which after streamlining is reduced to a standard linear programming model (Thie 1988, pp. 314–317) that is readily solved by linear programming algorithms.

To reiterate,  this linear programming model is an instance of the generic Maximin model obtained via simplification of the classical Maximin formulation of the 2-person zero-sum game.

Another example is dynamic programming where the Maximin paradigm is incorporated in the dynamic programming functional equation representing sequential decision processes that are subject to severe uncertainty (e.g. Sniedovich 2003).

Summary 
Recall that in plain language the Maximin paradigm maintains the following:
The maximin rule tells us to rank alternatives by their worst possible outcomes: we are to adopt the alternative the worst outcome of which is superior to the worst outcome of the others.Rawls (1971, p. 152)

Info-gap's robustness model is a simple instance of this paradigm that is characterized by a specific decision space, state spaces and objective function, as discussed above.

Much can be gained by viewing info-gap's theory in this light.

See also

Bayesian estimation
Bayesian inference
Bayesian probability
Decision analysis
Decision theory
Hierarchical Bayes model
List of publications in statistics
Markov chain Monte Carlo
Robust decision making
Robust optimization
Robust statistics
Sensitivity analysis
Stability radius

Notes

References

External links 
 Info-Gap Theory and Its Applications, further information on info-gap theory
What is Info-Gap Theory? informal introduction
Making Responsible Decisions (When it Seems that You Can't): Engineering Design and Strategic Planning Under Severe Uncertainty
How Did Info-Gap Theory Start? How Does it Grow?
Frequently Asked Questions about info-gap theory
 Info-Gap Campaign, further analysis and critique of info-gap
Frequently Asked Questions about Info-Gap Decision Theory (PDF)

Decision theory
Robust statistics